Raghopur is a community development block in Vaishali district of Bihar. Situated between two streams of the Ganges river, it is a river island. It is connected to Patna by Pipa pul. Ancient name of Raghopur is Kotigram.

History
The creation and history of the Raghopur island are much older than previously thought, as recently Harappan-type bricks from Raghopur Diara were discovered. While digging for piling work to build a house at the Diara, around 10  km north of Patna, the landowner came across thousands of large bricks. He used some and kept the rest as samples out of curiosity. On 4 April 2017, the director of the state archaeological directorate, Atul Verma, visited the area and checked the samples. Vijay Kumar Choudhary, archaeologist and executive director of the Bihar Heritage Development Society, confirmed Harappan bricks  had the proportions of 1:2:4 in terms of thickness, width, and length. He said the state archaeological directorate's move was a step in the right direction to establish that human settlements existed in the area. Raghopur Diara is situated between Chechar in the north and Didarganj in the south, places of archaeological importance. Chechar in Vaishali is a Neolithic site, while remains from the Mauryan period have been found during excavations at Didarganj in Patna.

Geography
Surrounded by the Ganges on all sides, Raghopur consists mainly of alluvial soil. Every year this area gets submerged by water due to flooding by the Ganges. This has been helpful to Raghopur in that flooding also brings a new layer of soil, making the area fertile.

Demographics
As of the 2001 India census, Raghopur had a population of 187,722. Males constitute 54% of the population. Raghopur has an average literacy rate of 33%. The villages in Raghopur include Paharpur, Jurawanpur, Fatehpur, Birpur, Chaksingar, Rampur, and Shiv Nagar. Among all, Birpur is the largest village in this block.

Birpur 
Birpur is the largest village in Raghopur Block. The village consists of migrant Rajputs from Rajasthan during the Mughal period.

There are few schools and temples in Birpur.

There are no hospitals in Birpur village.

Chaksingar 
Chaksingar is a village in Raghopur Block in the Vaishali District of Bihar, India. It belongs to Tirhut Division. 

Maithili is the local language here. The people of this village are migrant Rajputs (Chandela) from Mahotsava Nagar or Mahoba. They are regarded to be Chandravanshi; i.e., the descendants of Soma (Sanskrit literal meaning: 'moon').

Rampur 
The Rampur Village, within the Raghopur Block of the Vaishali District, belongs to the Tirhut Division in the State of Bihar, India. It is located about 1 km towards west-northwest from the Raghopur Block Office, at the geo coordinates of 25.62 Latitude/85.13 Longitude and a postal code of 844508.

The most famous village in the Diyara Islands, Rampur, is the political centre of Raghopur and comes under the jurisdiction of its police station.

The people of the village have traditionally worked in education and armed forces. There are several government and public educational centers in Rampur, the Rampur government high school being one of the oldest and the largest in the community.

The land of Rampur has been twice ravaged by the Ganges River in the last century.

Fatehpur 

The Fatehpur village is within the Raghopur Block of the Vaishali district. It belongs to the Tirhut division in the State of Bihar, India. The Raghopur police station and block office are situated in this village. The famous Mata Maharani Temple is also here.

Rustampur 
The Rustampur village is a part of Raghopur block of Vaishali district that belongs to the Tirhut division of Bihar. It is the first village after crossing the river Ganga from the Kachchi Dargah area of Patna district. Nathuni Rai, Jamun Rai and his brothers were famous wrestlers from Vaishali district during British rule. People belonging to Yadav caste constitute most of the village's population, and are known for being wrestlers.

The Central Bank of India is officially situated in Rustampur. Schools in Rustampur are Utkarmit High School and Utkarmit Middle School. The police station is situated in this village as Rustampur outpost (O.P.) for maintaining law and order in nearby villages.

Transport
The nearest towns to Raghopur are Patna and Hajipur. The nearest railway stations are Khoosarupur Fatuha and Bankaghat. The nearest airport is in Patna. There is only one seasonal road link (Pipa pul) that connects it to Patna, Fatuha. Apart from that, boats are a primary method of reaching the area.

Economy
Agriculture is the main source of income for inhabitants of this river island. The main crops include wheat, rice, maize, and tobacco. The Raghopur people have a long tradition of joining the army; the majority of the service class is in the defense forces. There are no industries situated in this area because of inaccessibility and poor transportation.

Education
Raghopur has many government schools till 12th level. Higher education is not available, causing many students to migrate from the area and settle in Patna or Hajipur.

References 

Community development blocks in Vaishali district
Islands of India
Populated places in India